Butizide (or thiabutazide) is a diuretic of the thiazide class.

Medical uses
Butizide is used in combination with the potassium-sparing diuretic spironolactone for the second-line treatment of edema caused by heart failure, and for difficult cases of hypertension.

Adverse effects

Interactions
The hypotensive effects of butizide can be increased by antihypertensive drugs (especially ACE inhibitors), barbiturates, tricyclic antidepressants, and ethanol. Combinatino with beta blockers can increase blood glucose levels; and conversely, butizide can decrease the effects of antidiabetic drugs. As butizide lowers blood potassium and magnesium levels, it can increase the effects of cardiac glycosides. It can also increase lithium toxicity.

Nonsteroidal anti-inflammatory drugs can decrease the diuretic effect of butizide.

Pharmacology

Mechanism of action

Pharmacokinetics
Butizide is quickly absorbed from the gut with a bioavailability of 85%. It reaches highest blood plasma concentrations after 2.5 hours. Plasma protein binding is 60 to 80%. While the substance is metabolised in the liver, 30% are excreted in unchanged from with the urine. Elimination half-life is about four hours.

Chemistry

Synthesis

References

Thiazides